Snells Bush Church and Cemetery, also known as St. Paul's Dutch Reformed Church is a historic Dutch Reformed church located in Manheim, Herkimer County, New York.  It was built in 1852, and is a one-story, rectangular, Greek Revival style timber frame church.  The front gable roof is topped by a two-stage belfry.  Adjacent to the church is the contributing cemetery containing 345 recorded burials. The earliest burial dates to 1804.

It was added to the National Register of Historic Places in 2004.

References

External links
 
 

Dutch Reformed Church buildings
Churches on the National Register of Historic Places in New York (state)
Cemeteries on the National Register of Historic Places in New York (state)
Churches in Herkimer County, New York
Cemeteries in Herkimer County, New York
National Register of Historic Places in Herkimer County, New York
Reformed churches in the United States